Ferrater is a surname. Notable people with the surname include:

Gabriel Ferrater (1922–1972), Spanish author, translator, and scholar 
José Ferrater Mora (1912–1991), Catalan philosopher, essayist, and writer

See also
Ferriter